Saft El Laban is a city in Giza Governorate, Egypt.

Populated places in Giza Governorate